The Zenair Mono-Z CH 100 is a single-seat, single-engined Canadian light aircraft of the 1970s, that was designed by Chris Heintz.  It is a smaller version of the Zenair CH 200 with a less powerful engine, which was sold as a homebuilt aircraft by Zenair.

Development and design

After emigrating to Canada and setting up Zenair to sell plans and kits for amateur construction of his Zenith two-seat-light aircraft, the German aircraft designer Chris Heintz started design of a smaller, single-seat development of the Zenith, the Mono-Zenith. The Mono-Z CH 100 is similar to the Zenith that preceded it, a low-winged cantilever monoplane of all metal construction. The factory claimed a build time of 600 hours. It is designed to be powered by engines from 45 to 100 hp (33.5 to 74.5 kW).

The first CH 100 made its maiden flight on 8 May 1975, powered by a 55 hp (41 kW) Volkswagen air-cooled engine of 1600 cc, with 110 sets of plans and kits sold by 1982.  Zenair continued to produce kits until 1988.

Operational history
A total of three CH 100s were registered in Canada since 1987 and none are registered in 2010.

Specifications (65 hp engine)

See also

Notes

References

Taylor, John W. R. Jane's All The World's Aircraft 1976-77. London:Jane's Yearbooks, 1976. .
Taylor, John W. R. Jane's All The World's Aircraft 1982-83. London:Jane's Yearbooks, 1982. .
Taylor, John W. R. Jane's All The World's Aircraft 1988-89. Coulsdon, UK:Jane's Defence Data, 1988. .

External links
Photo of a CH 100

1970s Canadian sport aircraft
Homebuilt aircraft
CH 100
Single-engined tractor aircraft
Low-wing aircraft
Aircraft first flown in 1975